The Southern Association of Independent Schools (SAIS) is a U.S.-based voluntary organization of more than 380 independent elementary and secondary schools through the South, representing more than 220,000 students.

SAIS represents schools in 14 Southeastern states including the Caribbean and Latin America, making SAIS the largest regional independent school association in the country. It serves as a regional accrediting association, working independently of and in conjunction with the Southern Association of Colleges and Schools (SACS).  The SAIS is a member of the National Association of Independent Schools.

SAIS-SACS Accreditation History
SAIS has been offering a dual accreditation since 1953. In 2004, SAIS began offering a dual accreditation with SACS, the Southern Association of Colleges and Schools. Later SAIS has been working with SACS to develop standards and self-study processes more useful for independent schools.

The participating school must meet the standards listed in the Guidebook for SAIS-SACS Accreditation. SAIS-SACS accreditation is contingent upon the school meeting all standards by responding in writing to each indicator. When evidence of an indicator is not shown, the school must explain how the standard is met in the absence of the indicator. The chair and visiting team report to the SAIS Accreditation Committee if the school has met the standards and performed a thorough and adequate self-study. The SAIS Accreditation Committee has final approval of whether or not the school meets the standards and is accredited.

Schools participating in the SAIS-SACS process communicate and work with SAIS in preparation for the accreditation cycle. Schools do not work with their respective state SACS committees regarding SAIS-SACS Accreditation.

External links
 http://www.sais.org
 http://www.nais.org
 http://www.sacs.org

United States schools associations